Isla del Laja (lit. Island of the Laja) is an old name for a strip of land between two rivers in Central Chile. Isla del Laja is the land between the banks of Laja River in the north and Bío Bío River in the south. Prior to 1791 Isla del Laja was also a corregimiento, an administrative division of Colonial Chile.

See also
Banditry in Chile
Guerra a muerte
Pehuenche
Pincheira brothers

References
  Francisco Solano Asta-Buruaga y Cienfuegos, Diccionario geográfico de la República de Chile, D. Appleton y Compania, Nueva York, 1899 p. 354

Historical regions
Geography of Biobío Region